Chris Pramas is an American game designer and writer, as well as a founder of Green Ronin Publishing. He is best known as the designer of the Dragon Age RPG, Warhammer Fantasy Roleplay (second edition), and Freeport: The City of Adventure.

Career

Early career
Pramas began his career in the game industry as a freelancer in 1993, contributing to games such as Mayfair Games' Underground, Pariah Press' Dangerous Prey supplement (1995), and Hogshead Publishing's The Dying of the Light (1995) Warhammer Fantasy Roleplay campaign. He also contributed to the game Over the Edge. In early 1996, Pramas acquired The Whispering Vault rights from Mike Nystul and formed Ronin Publishing with his brother Jason Pramas and their mutual friend Neal Darcy; Jason Pramas left before long, and Ronin Publishing only successfully published The Book of Hunts (1997) before the rights to The Whispering Vault were transferred to another company. In August 1997, Pramas moved to Seattle, Washington, and made freelancing his full-time occupation. Pramas worked on Blood of the Valiant (1998), a Feng Shui sourcebook for Daedalus Games; when that company went out of business, Pramas instead got a license to publish the adventure, which became Ronin Publishing's second and final book.

Wizards of the Coast
Pramas accepted a job offer from Wizards of the Coast in March 1998. Working as an RPG designer for Wizards, he designed Dragon Fist, a wuxia-inspired version of AD&D, which was released as one of the company's first PDF releases in 1999. Pramas also contributed to several AD&D products and co-authored the Dark•Matter adventure The Final Church (2000), another PDF-only release. Pramas was then pulled into Wizards' new miniatures division as the creative designer for the Chainmail Miniatures Game (2001). Pramas designed the world for Chainmail, which he called the "Sundered Empire"; he originally intended this to be a standalone setting but management asked him to place the Sundered Empire in Greyhawk, so he made it into the subcontinent Western Oerik.

Pramas' work for Dungeons & Dragons includes: Slavers (2000, with Sean K. Reynolds), Guide to Hell (1999), Apocalypse Stone (2000, with Jason Carl), Vortex of Madness (2000), as well as some work on the third edition Player's Handbook (2000) and Dungeon Master's Guide (2000).

Green Ronin
Pramas founded Green Ronin Publishing in 2000 with his wife Nicole Lindroos, and by 2001 they had brought on a third member of the team, Hal Mangold, to do freelance graphic layout for the company. In March 2002, Pramas was laid off from Wizards of the Coast. Toren Atkinson of the band The Darkest of the Hillside Thickets arranged with Pramas to have Green Ronin publish his RPG Spaceship Zero (2002) based on one of his band's albums. Pramas asked Steve Kenson to design a new d20-based superhero RPG for Green Ronin, which resulted in Mutants & Masterminds (2002). In 2004, Green Ronin was incorporated as an LLC, with Pramas, Lindroos, and Mangold coming on as the three partners. Pramas designed the second edition Warhammer Fantasy Roleplay (2005) for Games Workshop. For Green Ronin, Pramas wrote The Pirate's Guide to Freeport (2007) with Patrick O'Duffy and Robert J. Schwalb. While continuing to lead Green Ronin Publishing, Pramas is a content designer for the Pirates of the Burning Sea massively multi-player online game at Flying Lab Software. Pramas designed the simple class-and-level system for the RPG Dragon Age: Set I (2009).

Pramas also worked as the lead writer for Warhammer 40,000: Dark Millennium Online at Vigil Games.

Pramas was a notable guest at Trinoc*coN in 2005, and a guest of honour at Ropecon 2008 in Dipoli, Espoo, Finland. He has also been a guest of Pacificon in 2015, and OrcaCon in 2016.

In 2012, he appeared on two episodes of the web series TableTop running his Dragon Age roleplaying game for host Wil Wheaton and the show's guests. Since 2012 he has also been one of the curators of an annual "Art of RPGs" art show featuring the work of artists whose work have appeared in role-playing games.

Bibliography
Books and games Pramas has written or contributed to include the following:

Books
 Dwarf Warfare (Osprey Publishing)
 Orc Warfare (Osprey Publishing)
 The Kobold Guide to Combat (Kobold Press)
 The Kobold Guide to Worldbuilding (Kobold Press)
 Family Games: The 100 Best (Green Ronin)
 Hobby Games: The 100 Best (Green Ronin)

Games
 Torches & Pitchforks: The Card Game of Monster Movie Mayhem (Green Ronin)
 Magic the Gathering: Urza's Legacy (Wizards of the Coast)

Role Playing Games
 Dragon Age (Green Ronin)
 Dragon Age Set 1
 Dragon Age Set 2
  Dragon Age Set 3
  Dragon Age Core Rulebook
 Freeport (Green Ronin)
  Freeport: The City of Adventure
  The Pirates Guide to Freeport
  Crisis in Freeport
  Madness in Freeport
  Terror in Freeport
  Death in Freeport
  The Freeport Trilogy
  Creatures of Freeport
  Black Sails Over Freeport
 Warhammer
 Warhammer 40,000: Dark Heresy (Games Workshop / Black Industries, Fantasy Flight Games)
  Warhammer Fantasy Roleplay, 2nd Edition
  Warhammer Fantasy Roleplay: Children of the Horned Rat (Games Workshop / Black Industries, Green Ronin)
  Warhammer Fantasy Roleplay: Spires of Altdorf (Games Workshop / Black Industries, Green Ronin)
  Warhammer Fantasy Roleplay: Shades of Empire (Games Workshop / Black Industries, Green Ronin)
  Warhammer Fantasy Roleplay: Sigmar's Heirs: A Guide to the Empire (Games Workshop / Black Industries, Green Ronin)
  Warhammer Fantasy Roleplay: Old World Armoury (Games Workshop / Black Industries, Green Ronin)
  Warhammer Fantasy Roleplay: Ashes of Middenheim (Games Workshop / Black Industries, Green Ronin)
  Warhammer Fantasy Roleplay: Old World Bestiary (Games Workshop / Black Industries, Green Ronin)
  Warhammer Fantasy Roleplay: Plundered Vaults (Games Workshop / Black Industries, Green Ronin)
 Dungeons & Dragons (Wizards of the Coast)
 Dungeons & Dragons: Chainmail
 Shadow of the Drow
 The Ghostwind Campaign
 Fire and Ice
 Blood and Darkness
 Secrets of Magic, "Burning Vengeance"
 The Final Church
 Slavers
 The Apocalypse Stone
 The Vortex of Madness
 Dragon Fist
 The Guide to Hell
 Fantasy AGE (Green Ronin)
 Titansgrave: The Ashes of Valkana (Green Ronin)
 A Song of Ice and Fire Roleplaying (Green Ronin)
 Mutants and Masterminds (Green Ronin)
 Hong Kong Action Theater, 2nd Edition (Guardians of Order)
 True 20 (Green Ronin)
 The Emerald Spire Superdungeon (Paizo Publishing)
 Hillfolk RPG: "Brigade" (Pelgrane Press)
 Nocturals: A Midnight Companion (Green Ronin)
 Pathfinder Chronicles: Guide to the River Kingdoms (Paizo Publishing)
 Medieval Player's Manual (Green Ronin)
 The Psychic's Handbook (Green Ronin)
 Testament: Roleplaying in the Biblical Era (Green Ronin)
 Star Trek: The Next Generation RPG (Last Unicorn Games)
 Forgotten Lives (Atlas Games)
 Heaven and Hell (Steve Jackson Games)
 The Book of Hunts (Ronin Publishing)
 Marked for Death (Daedalus Entertainment)
 Dying of the Light (Hogshead Publishing)
 Underground Companion (Mayfair Games)
 Underground Player's Handbook (Mayfair Games)

Dragon magazine articles
 Pramas, Chris. "Ahmut's Legion." Dragon #286. Renton, WA: Wizards of the Coast, 2001.
 -----. "The Armies of Thalos." Dragon #287. Renton, WA: Wizards of the Coast, 2001.
 -----. "The Children of Nassica." Dragon #295. Renton, WA: Wizards of the Coast, 2002.
 -----. "Drazen's Horde." Dragon #292. Renton, WA: Wizards of the Coast, 2002.
 -----. "The Ebon Glaive." Dragon #296. Renton, WA: Wizards of the Coast, 2002.
 -----. "The Empire of Ravilla." Dragon #285. Renton, WA: Wizards of the Coast, 2001.
 -----. "Exiles from the Vault." Dragon #298. Renton, WA: Wizards of the Coast, 2002.
 -----. "The Free States." Dragon #293. Renton, WA: Wizards of the Coast, 2002.
 -----. "The Gnolls of Naresh." Dragon #289. Renton, WA: Wizards of the Coast, 2001.
 -----. "People's State of Mordengard." Dragon #291. Renton, WA: Wizards of the Coast, 2002.
 -----. "The Sundered Empire: Soldiers of the Last Order." Dragon #315. Bellevue, WA: Paizo Publishing, January 2004.
 -----. "Underground Scenarios." Dragon #294. Renton, WA: Wizards of the Coast, 2002.

Media mentions
Chris Pramas has appeared in the following newspaper and magazine articles, websites and podcasts.

Podcasts
 Caustic Soda: Episodes "Hitler" (2011), and "Regicide, Part 2" (2013)
 RPG Countdown: Chris appeared on these episodes: 22 April 2009 (Warriors & Warlocks), 1 July 2009 (Sigmar’s Heirs), 15 July 2009 (GM Pack and Toolkit).
 TableTop: "Dragon Age", Parts 1 & 2 (Season 1, Episodes 19 & 20 (2013)
 Titansgrave
 Vigilance Press Podcast

References

External links
 

Dungeons & Dragons game designers
Living people
Year of birth missing (living people)